The 1968 1. divisjon was the 24th completed season of top division football in Norway.

Overview
It was contested by 10 teams, and Lyn from Oslo won the championship, their second title. Lyn's 28 points was at the time a record for most points in a season, one more than Vålerengen achieved in the 1965 season. Frigg and Vålerengen were relegated to the 1969 2. divisjon.

Odd Iversen of Rosenborg scored 30 goals this season, which as of the start of the 2019 season is still a league record. On 20 October, Iversen scored six goals in Rosenborg's 7–2 win against Vålerengen. That is still a joint league record for most goals scored in one game, an achievement Jan Fuglset copied in 1976.

Teams and locations
''Note: Table lists in alphabetical order.

League table

Results

Season statistics

Top scorer
  Odd Iversen, Rosenborg – 30 goals

Attendances

References
Norway - List of final tables (RSSSF)
Norsk internasjonal fotballstatistikk (NIFS)

Eliteserien seasons
Norway
Norway
1